Carmen Thalmann (born 11 September 1989) is an Austrian former alpine ski racer. She competed at the 2015 World Championships in Beaver Creek, USA, where she placed seventh in the slalom.

World Cup results

Standings through 4 February 2018

World Championship results

References

External links
 
 Carmen Thalmann World Cup standings at the International Ski Federation
 

1989 births
Austrian female alpine skiers
Living people
20th-century Austrian women
21st-century Austrian women